Salawas railway station is a main railway station in Jodhpur district, Rajasthan. Its code is SZ. It serves Salawas city. The station consists of a single platform.  It lacks many facilities including water and sanitation. It is located approximately 8 km from Jodhpur railway station. The railway station is under the administrative control of North Western Railway of Indian Railways.

Major trains

Some of the important trains that run from Salawas are :

Ahmedabad–Jodhpur Passenger (unreserved)
Ajmer–Jodhpur Fast Passenger
 Barmer–Jodhpur DMU
 Barmer–Jodhpur Passenger (unreserved)
 Bhildi–Jodhpur Demu
Jodhpur–Palanpur DMU

References

Railway stations in Jodhpur district
Transport in Jodhpur
Jodhpur railway division
Buildings and structures in Jodhpur
Jodhpur